"L'Amour à la plage" is a song by the French band Niagara. Originally issued as a single, it was included on their debut album Encore un dernier baiser, released in the autumn of the same year 1986.

By the time the single came out, the band became a duo, as guitarist José Tamarin left the trio after the release of their debut single Tchiki boum.

Writing and composition 
The song was written by Muriel Laporte.

According to Jean-Emmanuel Deluxe and his book Yé-Yé Girls of '60s French Pop,  the song "L'Amour à la plage" "was emblematic of the country's desire to escape the grim reality of the economic crisis of the mid-1980s".

Track listings 
7" single Polydor 883 991-7 (1986)
 "L'amour à la plage" (3:22)
 "Les amants" (2:42)
 		 	 
12" maxi single Polydor 883 991-1 (1986)
 "L'amour à la plage (Version Longue)" (4:36)
 "Les amants" (2:42)

Charts

Cover versions 
The song was covered, among others, by Lorie, Virginie Ledoyen, Suarez & Alice on the Roof, and by Collectif Métissé.

References 

1986 songs
1986 singles
Niagara (band) songs
Polydor Records singles